Eucalyptus wimmerensis, commonly known as the Wimmera mallee box or the broad-leaved green mallee, is a species of mallee that is endemic to an area around the border between Victoria and South Australia. It usually has smooth bark on the trunk and branches, linear to narrow oblong leaves, flower buds in groups of seven to eleven, white flowers and cup-shaped to barrel-shaped fruit.

Description
Eucalyptus wimmerensis is a multi-stemmed and often erect mallee that typically grows to height of  rarely to  but never a tree. It has smooth grey, tan or cream-coloured bark, sometimes with fibrous bark near the base. Flowering occurs from summer to late autumn and the flowers are white.

Taxonomy and naming
Eucalyptus wimmerensis was first formally described in 1990 by Kevin James Rule in the journal Muelleria from specimens collected in 1964 by James Hamlyn Willis on the Lawloit Range between Nhill and Kaniva. The specific epithet (wimmerensis) refers to the Wimmera region of Victoria where this species occurs.

In 2018, Rule described five subspecies, but the names have not been accepted by the Australian Plant Census:
 Eucalyptus wimmerensis subsp. arapilensis Rule;
 Eucalyptus wimmerensis subsp. grata Rule;
 Eucalyptus wimmerensis subsp. pallida Rule;
 Eucalyptus wimmerensis subsp. parviformis Rule;
 Eucalyptus wimmerensis Rule subsp. wimmerensis.

Distribution and habitat
The Wimmera mallee box has a scattered distribution in the Little Desert National Park and adjacent area of South Australia. It is most common between Dimboola and Nhill and between Nhill and Kaniva, where it grows in sandy soils or gravelly loams in mallee vegetation or mixed mallee woodland. As with some other Eucalypts, it occurs in lands cleared for agriculture. As a result it is difficult to relate its distribution to the natural state. Some stands of E. wimmerensis include hybrids, even with the distantly related mallees of the E. dumosa group.

See also
List of Eucalyptus species

References

wimmerensis
Myrtales of Australia
Flora of South Australia
Flora of Victoria (Australia)
Plants described in 1990